is a Japanese historical manga series written and illustrated by Makoto Yukimura. The series is published by Kodansha, and was first serialized in the boys youth-targeted manga magazine Weekly Shōnen Magazine before moving to the monthly manga magazine Monthly Afternoon, aimed at young adult men. As of May 2022, its chapters have been collected in 26 tankōbon volumes. Vinland Saga has been licensed for English-language publication by Kodansha USA.

The title, Vinland Saga, would evoke associations to Vinland as described in two Norse sagas. Vinland Saga, however, begins in Dane-controlled England at the start of the 11th century, and features the Danish invaders of England, commonly known as Vikings. The story combines a dramatization of King Cnut the Great's historical rise to power with a revenge plot centered on the historical explorer Thorfinn, the son of a murdered ex-warrior who serves under a group of mercenaries responsible for the deed.

A 24-episode anime television series adaptation, animated by Wit Studio, aired on NHK General TV from July to December 2019. A second season, animated by MAPPA, premiered on Tokyo MX and BS11 in January 2023.

As of August 2022, Vinland Saga had over 7 million copies in circulation. The series won the 36th Kodansha Manga Award for Best General Manga and the Grand Prize of the 13th Japan Media Arts Festival. The anime adaptation was widely praised, with several critics calling it one of the best anime series of 2019.

Synopsis

Setting
Vinland Saga is initially set mostly in 1013 AD England, which has been mostly conquered by the Danish King Sweyn Forkbeard. As King Sweyn nears death, his sons, Prince Harald and Prince Canute, are arguing over his succession. The story draws elements from historical accounts of the period such as The Flateyjarbók, The Saga of the Greenlanders and The Saga of Erik the Red.

Plot

In 1013 AD, the young Thorfinn works for Askeladd in the hopes of challenging to a duel and kill him in revenge for his father's death, Thors, when they were attacked by him on a journey to England. Askeladd's company finds employment  as mercenaries under the Danish King Sweyn in the Danish invasion of London by the British and Thorkell the Tall, Thorfin's uncle who served with Thors in the Jomsvikings. When Thorkell takes Sweyn's son Prince Canute captive, Askeladd's company capture the prince with the intent of selling him to either side for a profit. Askeladd changes his plan to act on his personal agenda as a descendant of Artorius to secure his mother's homeland of Wales from being invaded. Askeladd is ultimately forced to sacrifice himself by killing Sweyn during an audience when the king announces his plan to invade Wales, feigning madness as Canute kills him, so the prince could take over Dane-occupied England without question. Thorfinn scars Canute in an attempt on the prince's life and is sentenced by an empathic Canute with life in enslavement.

A year after Askeladd's death, Thorfinn is working on a farm owned by Ketil, a rich farmer who treats slaves well. He later befriends another slave named Einar. With Einar's help along with Snake, the farm's head of security, and Ketil's father Sverker, Thorfinn learns to let go of his dark past and is encouraged by dreams of his father, Thors, and Askeladd to pursue a life of peace and away from the Vikings' violent lifestyle. Canute had become both King of England and Denmark after poisoning his brother Harald. Canute begins his campaign with Ketil's farm, tricking Ketil's sons, Thorgil and Olmar, into justifying the seizure with Ketil's men easily defeated by Canute's Jomsvikings. Thorfinn confronts Canute to convince him to spare the farmers. Canute renounces his claim to the farm after seeing the pacifist Thorfinn has become. With Thorfinn and Einar now freed, they sail back to Iceland with Leif, an old friend of Thorfinn's father.

Reunited with his family, Thorfinn explains his intent to settle Vinland and build a new life of peace. In order to gain the funding for the trip to Vinland, Thorfinn, Leif, Einar and Leif's adopted son, Thorfinn "Bug-Eyes", plan to travel to Greece and sell narwhal horns there. Thorfinn's crew is later joined by others and, after attempting to fight them, are captured by some Jomsvikings and end up in service under Thorkell. Thorfinn recommences his journey with his crew. Thorfinn draws away the assassins around a set of islands while the rest of the crew escape toward Odense. Two spies among them take Thorfinn and Hild to meet Captain Vagn, the leader of a rebel camp of Jomsvikings who seek to usurp power from Floki before it goes into the hands of Floki's grandson Baldr. The surviving men of Vagn's camp swear allegiance to Thorkell who promises revenge against Floki for using Garm as an assassin. A series of battles erupt between Thorkell and Floki's forces at Jomsburg. Thorkell's army defeats Floki and captures him and Baldr, who was earlier revealed to be Thorfinn's cousin. Thorfinn is temporarily made leader of the Jomsvikings carries out orders from Canute to disband the Jomsvikings and spare Floki and Baldr from execution.

Two years later, Thorfinn's crew returned to Iceland with the wealth they acquired from selling the narwhal horns. Thorfinn and Gudrid marry and raise Karli as their son. With the resources promised by Halfdan, Thorfinn begins to assemble a crew to settle in Vinland. Thorfinn achieves peace by creating a dreamland land where weapons are not needed, clearing a portion of the forest, and successfully cultivates wheat. They even manage to make peace with the natives. The natives think of them as peaceful dwellers.

Production

Makoto Yukimura began serializing Vinland Saga in April 2005 in Kodansha's Weekly Shōnen Magazine, where it ran until October 2005. After a two-month hiatus, it resumed serialization late December 2005 in the seinen magazine Monthly Afternoon, also owned by Kodansha. This switch was caused by Yukimura, who found he could not keep up a long-term weekly production schedule. He sometimes works 18 hours as one of his techniques requires a lot of time. He also said he creates and submits one page each day to the publisher. He states how tens of thousands of people wish to work creating manga and the competition results in high quality manga production. When he first started drawing, Yukimura expected it to take 10 years, but it will still take 14 years to finish. He had calculated that there would be 20 volumes, with each part consisting of four volumes, with five volumes each, but then the amount increased to over 22 volumes. From the beginning of the serialization, he was at a loss, wondering when he could write the actual arc of Vinland. Because he often had problems with handling the story, Yukimura looks to Hajime Isayama for his work on Attack on Titan due to how he was able to handle the entire plot until the end especially since its 20th volume. He started drawing fully digitally at the chapter 168 due to Covid restrictions. However, he does inking in analog, then scans and does the finishing work digitally.

According to Yukimura, the series is divided into four story arcs; the "War" arc; the "Slave" arc; and the "Eastern Expedition" arc. The fourth and final arc was not given its own distinct name. In November 2019, Yukimura announced that the manga has entered its final arc; it will be more than 50 chapters long and more than 1,000 pages, and will take "several years to write".

Influences
Yukimura was inspired by anime series about Vikings that he watched as a child, and since then he has been fascinated by them. Their culture and way of life was something new and fresh. He learned, for instance, that if somebody killed while intoxicated he could get a lower sentence or go free. He travelled to Norway and Scandinavia in 2003 to conduct research on Vikings. It was difficult due to the language barrier as he speaks no Norwegian and little English. He was able to see Oseberg Ship which he says is the most beautiful ship he has ever seen. Yukimura compares Vikings to Japanese pirates as he would find more differences than similarities between Vikings and samurai. The author believes Vikings are more free and honest about their own feelings; Samurai are more quiet as a people, and were obedient towards their master or own honour. As research he visited Denmark, Iceland, France, Britain and Canada (and regretted that his story was not found closer to home). He also makes full-scale models because he wants materials as realistic as possible, but the production of those models puts a lot of pressure on his time schedule.

While the Vikings are recognized as heroes, Yukimura wanted to explain the harsh realities living in their era. Because of the harsh violence, the Thorfinn was always drawn with a serious facial expression in the first arc as well as with self-deprecation in the following arc where he pitied himself for his sins. As a result, the character of Thorkell is characterized as more comical and this makes the battles more enjoyable to draw. Meanwhile, Yukimura was often told by his editors not to draw Canute with a beard as they claimed it would not make the series popular as a result of ruining the bishonen archetype he represented. He rejected that idea, claiming that every man had a beard in that era. Meanwhile, Thorfinn becomes an adult in the second story arc, but he shaves his beard as Yukimura did not want him to look strong.

The real Thorfinn attracted Yukimura after reading a book about him. With little historical information about Thorfinn, it motivated him to act as the protagonist because he would have more freedom. Yukimura believes Thorfinn's growth with Askeladd was well executed. He said the character of Askeladd became ambiguous even to himself as a result of the many sides he exposes in the manga. Yukimura states that when writing the characters, most of them are who Thorfinn needs with Askeladd being the exception as he is both Thorfinn's mentor and enemy. They have a seeming father-son relationship as at the beginning of the series, Yukimura was planning Askeladd's death and Thorfinn's reaction to it. Another complicated relationship involves Einar and Thorfinn as the two cannot help each other due to dark narrative involvement. One of Yukimura's themes is learning the effects of revenge on others. Yukimura regrets how he developed the character Einar.

Several characters are based on real life. The historical Leif Eiriksson is a famous Norsemen. However, Yukimura imagined that he would have had a very weak nature as a warrior so he instead fleshed him out as a strong adventurer. In retrospect, Yukimura found that the series features prominently male characters as the female ones die or are given little screen time. One of the few exceptions is Gudrid—she is based on a historical figure with the same name who makes a major impact on Thorfinn's life and the author tries to be faithful to such event. Meanwhile, the revengeful hunter Hild reminds Thorfinn of his sins as a Viking in the same way as in the start of the series—with Thorfinn wanting revenge on Askeladd.

The series' final arc, which is set in Vinland, prominently features the Mi'kmaq people. The depictions of such culture were made with guidance of Beverly Jedore and Yolanda Denny of the educational organization Miꞌkmaw Kinaꞌmatnewey. Depiction of the Miꞌkmaq language involved Dr. Bernie Francis, a linguistic and scholar who helped make the Francis-Smith orthography which is the officially accepted orthography of the Mik'maq Grand Council.

Themes

In a January 2008 interview, Yukimura revealed that he was inspired to enter the manga industry by reading the manga Fist of the North Star as a boy. In the same interview, he said he had always wanted to produce a series which reflected the same themes of "strength and justice". Yukimura's editor was against the idea of Thorfinn being a slave so he was changed into a Viking. The author agreed as he wanted Thorfinn to understand the causes of tragedy by his being a Viking in later parts of the narrative. He wanted the protagonist to be shaved by violence, often having poor luck. 

Yukimura added that one of his messages is that people should have ideals in order to have a prosperous life. In contrast to the strong Vikings, the portrayal of slaves were written as their complete opposite based on research the author made. The slaves do not possess power at all to protect themselves; Yukimura believed that they also are unable to have their own ideals to live which he disliked when reading. 

One of the earliest concepts when drawing Thorfinn was to make a story about a slave. Despite being a slave, Thorfinn would face several challenges and reach his goal. Yukimura was inspired by King of Norway Olaf Tryggvason who lost his position as king to become a slave but managed to return to his original position. Unlike Tryggvason who was extremely popular, Thorfinn was written to face several more problems. Yukimura wanted Thorfinn to learn about oppression and human afflictions. In retrospect, Yukimura stated that Thorfinn does not have a notable skill or imposing physique. In order to stand out as a main character, he was written to have the experience the pain human beings suffer. Although Thorfinn's appearance changes across the four story arcs, Yukimura was careful to writing his psychology.

While the series is notable for its degree of violence normally caused by Vikings, Yukimura claimed he hates the concept of violence. As a result, a key element in writing this story was relaxing his modern sense of morality. The handling of the Vikings was that they admired the strength from each of their mates with Askeladd being respected as a result. Nevertheless, there are several betrayals. The anime added more scenes involving Thorfinn joining Askeladd's forces as well as how he becomes a skilled warrior which the manga author appreciated. The writer convinced the director to make the anime different from the manga in order to tell the story chronologically in contrast to how the manga starts with an already teenage Thorfinn remembering his childhood and father's death. Another addition was the first scene where Thors fights alongside Thorkell before his retiring from the forces. In order to adapt the boat scenes, the staff used 3D animation with the action and cameraset at the work. The team was also careful with how adapting the first fight between Thorfinn and Thorkell. Nevertheless, Seko believes Yukimura's version of the narrative is stronger. Yukimura's sensation during the Cold War and the September 11 attacks were projected onto Thorfinn's character who is traumatized by his actions as a Viking and thus decides to found Vinland in order to make a land where people from different races are able to live together peacefully.

Media

Manga

Vinland Saga is written and illustrated by Makoto Yukimura. The series was first serialized in Kodansha's shōnen manga magazine Weekly Shōnen Magazine from April 13 to October 19, 2005. The series was transferred to Kodansha's seinen manga magazine Monthly Afternoon, starting in the February 2006 issue, released on December 24, 2005. Kodansha has collected its chapters into individual tankōbon (bound volumes). The first two volumes were initially released under the Shōnen Magazine Comics imprint, and then reissued under the Afternoon imprint after the manga's serialization switch. As of May 23, 2022, twenty-six volumes have been published.

The series is licensed in English by Kodansha USA, and it is being released in a two-in-one hardcover edition. The first volume was published on October 14, 2013. As of December 14, 2021, twelve volumes have been released. During their panel at Anime NYC 2022, Kodansha USA announced that they will release a 3-in-1 hardcover deluxe edition of the series.

Anime

An anime television series adaptation of Vinland Saga was announced in March 2018. Produced by Twin Engine, Production I.G, Wit Studio and Kodansha, the series is animated by Wit Studio and directed by Shūhei Yabuta, with Hiroshi Seko handling series composition, Takahiko Abiru designing the characters and Yutaka Yamada composing the music. The series ran for 24 episodes on NHK General TV. The series premiered on July 7, 2019, with the first three episodes. Due to the pending arrival of Typhoon Faxai on September 8, 2019, episode 10 was delayed due to broadcasting news, and premiered the following week. Due to the airing of the World Para Athletics Championship sports tournament on NHK, episode 18 was delayed and resumed on November 17 of the same year. The series finished on December 29, 2019. The first opening theme is "MUKANJYO." by Survive Said The Prophet while the first ending theme is "Torches" by Aimer. The second opening theme is "Dark Crow" by Man with a Mission and the second ending theme is "Drown" by milet.

Amazon streams the series in worldwide on their Prime Video service. Sentai Filmworks released the series on home video on August 31, 2021, with both a new translation and English dub. A different English dub, produced by VSI Los Angeles, previously launched on Netflix in Japan. MVM Entertainment licensed the series in the United Kingdom and Ireland. It began streaming on Netflix globally on July 7, 2022, as well as Crunchyroll and HiDive on select territories on the same day.

When the anime finale aired in Japan, director Shuhei Yabuta wrote, "This big incident changed everything for Thorfinn, but his story will continue!". On July 7, 2021, Twin Engine announced that a second season is in production. Shūhei Yabuta returned as director, and Takahiko Abiru returned as character designer. It is animated by MAPPA and premiered on Tokyo MX, BS11, and GBS on January 10, 2023. The season will run for 24 episodes. The second season is being simulcasted globally on both Netflix excluding China, and Crunchyroll excluding China, South Korea and Japan. The opening theme is "River" by Anonymouz, while the ending theme is "Without Love" by LMYK.

Other media
Yukimura drew a seven-page crossover manga chapter between the series and the Assassin's Creed Valhalla video game that was uploaded to Ubisoft's website on October 23, 2020.

Reception

Manga

Sales
Vinland Saga has been commercially successful in Japan, with combined sales of 1.2 million copies for the first five volumes as of June 2008. It had over 5 million copies in print as of 2018. Several volumes have appeared on the Taiyosha top ten best-selling manga list. As of August 2022, the manga had over 7 million copies in circulation.

Critical reception
Even before its international release, Vinland Saga attracted attention and praise from the international manga community. In 2006, The Comics Journal included Vinland Saga in a list of worthy unlicensed manga and scanlation groups. Critics praised Vinland Saga for its fluid action sequences, remarking how well author Yukimura made the transition to the action genre from his previous work Planetes. Criticism was, however, levelled at the level of suspension of disbelief in a historical fiction series. Upon its official release, the first volume was reviewed by Rebecca Silverman for Anime News Network. She described it as a "deeply engrossing book" and praised it for its attention to detail and "excellent period detail" in its depiction of medieval times, though expressed disappointment at the lack of interesting female characters. Johanna Draper Carlson of Comics Worth Reading described the action in the first volume as "fast-paced, well-illustrated, and detailed" but "didn't transcend its premise"; she was instead more impressed by the scenes depicting family life, saying "that's where the insightful character work I expected from Yukimura came through." Carlson also praised the scenes depicting domestic life as providing grounding context for the story, as well as weaving in religion and politics, finding Vinland Saga "a fascinating read on multiple levels". In The European Middle Ages through the prism of Contemporary Japanese Literature, Maximen Denise from University of Tours noted how the lack of proper knowledge about the real life of Thorfinn in The Greenlanders and Eric the Red made Yukimura come across with a more original character for how the main character becomes a Viking during his youth, giving him a realistic characterization which contrast to Thorkell's supernatural strength. According to the writer, while Thorfinn is originally driven by revenge, the main motivation featured in manga also explore his desire to have power similar to "those who desperately struggle to find their homelands in the 21st century 'medieval' Japan".

Following the end of the first story arc, critics were surprised by Thorfinn's quieter personality and noted that despite his life as a slave, the plot manages to make his life with other slaves interesting. Sportskeeda called  Thorfinn's development one of the most interesting from seinen manga. The romantic relationship between Thorfinn and Gugrid surprised Manga News, but still appreciated the handling of their wedding ceremony, which gave the narrative a lighter narrative for a famous dark series. Manga Sanctuary agreed, finding Thorfinn to live to his father's legacy during his quest while finding his new found family appealing not only including his wife Gugrid but also his adopted son who often defends hims.

In regards to the art, Silverman initially felt it was "a bit generic shounen", but praised the improvement of the art during the Slave arc. The panel composition, realistically barbaric violence, and attention to detail in constructing the setting were highlighted and compared with those found in Kentaro Miura's long-running series Berserk. Comic Book Resources acclaimed the art as one of the reasons to why the manga became highly popular. The return of action scenes in the Merchant arc was praised by Manga News for showing how detailed Yukimura's art can be.

Manga author Hajime Isayama said that Thorfinn is his favorite character from Vinland Saga due to his humanity and guilt.

Accolades
The manga was nominated for the 1st Manga Taisho award in 2008. Vinland Saga was awarded the Grand Prize of the Manga Division at the 13th Japan Media Arts Festival in 2009; It was also a Jury Recommended work at the 25th edition in 2022. It won the 36th Kodansha Manga Award for Best General Manga in 2012.

Anime
The anime adaptation of Vinland Saga was awarded Anime of the Year in the 6th Anime Trending Awards. The anime series was selected as "Best Drama" while receiving eight other nominations including "Anime of the Year" at the 4th Crunchyroll Anime Awards. IGN listed Vinland Saga among the best anime series of the 2010s. In a poll conducted by Kadokawa Game Linkage of the most satisfying series of 2019, Vinland Saga ranked in ninth place. Several writers from Anime News Network also listed the series as one of the best ones from 2019; with James Beckett listing Askeladd as best character.

Rafael Motamayor of Polygon praised the anime series and compared it to Vikings. Motamayor commended the character development shown in its first three episodes and ultimately called it an epic story that shows "the horrors of being a Viking at the turn of the 11th century, while also serving as a coming-of-age tale set against the background of a bloody and thrilling war". Gerald Rathkolb of Otaku USA called Vinland Saga a "story of a long, brilliantly written slow-burn revenge story" and named it one of the best anime series of 2019. Rathkolb wrote: "[It] is one of those rare anime that could have appeal outside of the anime sphere because of its setting and focus on complex characters and the excellent political intrigue ever-present in the show. It comes with my highest recommendation". Nick Creamer from Anime News Network also delivered a positive review, praising the themes, action scenes and characters, stating "No one has any enemies, is one of Vinland Sagas principal lessons, a prayer of social goodwill that Thors complements with his dream of a distant, shimmering Vinland, a land free of strife and suffering. But Vinland Saga is not a sentimental work, and its conflicts stay mired in the blood and dirt of a country at war. Thors' idealistic prayer is quickly supplemented by a new moral, courtesy of the raider and mercenary lord Askeladd: "everyone is a slave, even if they can't see the chains." It's a story suffused with a thematic ambition and sharpness of perspective that raises its high above its genre peers. Populated with rich, sympathetic characters and adorned by breathtaking action highlights, it is a rich and rewarding adventure that might just inspire you to challenge the conditions of your own life. Beautiful, brutal, and fiercely intelligent. Succeeds effortlessly as a propulsive action vehicle, while also offering sharp commentary on human nature, remarkably characters, and a harsh yet beautifully realized world. Vinland Saga is one of the best anime of 2019".

Yukimura praised the adaptation, believing that it smoothed out pacing issues present in the original manga, and that anime's staff understood the story better than he did. He further recommended that people watch the anime before picking up the manga.

Notes

ReferencesVinland Saga volumes'

Further reading

External links
  
  
  
 

2005 manga
2019 anime television series debuts
Adventure anime and manga
Anime and manga about revenge
Cnut the Great
Comics set in Denmark
Comics set in England
Comics set in Norway
Comics set in the 11th century
Comics set in the Viking Age
Coming-of-age anime and manga
Crunchyroll Anime Awards winners
Cultural depictions of Leif Erikson
Epic anime and manga
Historical anime and manga
Kodansha manga
MAPPA
Mi'kmaq in popular culture
NHK original programming
Seinen manga
Sentai Filmworks
Shōnen manga
Tokyo MX original programming
Vinland
Winner of Kodansha Manga Award (General)
Wit Studio